The 1983 Men's African Volleyball Championship was in Port Said, Egypt, with 7 teams participating in the continental championship.

Teams

Results

Final ranking

References
 Men Volleyball Africa Championship 1983 Port Said (EGY)

1983 Men
African championship, Men
Men's African Volleyball Championship
International volleyball competitions hosted by Egypt
1983 in Egyptian sport